Li Jindou is a Chinese comedian, sketch actor, xiangsheng performer, and professor of Chinese at Peking University. His disciples include Liu Ying, Ren Jun, Mao Wei, Han Bing, Liu Chang, Fu Qiang, Fang Qingping, Wang Zheng, Xu Qiang, Xu Mingzhe, Zhou Weixing, Xu Ming, Xue Xiaodong, Zhang Wei, Wang Qun, Shi Bufan, Yu Xuejun and Ma Qingjun.

Biography
Li was born on 15 October 1947, in Beijing. He started to learn the arts of xiangsheng from master Zhao Zhenduo. At the age of 13, he became an eighth-generation xiangsheng performer. Li performed xiangsheng in many areas, such as America, Canada, Singapore, Hongkong and Taiwan.

References

Chinese xiangsheng performers
1957 births
Living people
Male actors from Beijing
Chinese male stage actors
Academic staff of Peking University
Educators from Beijing